Evan William Bush (born March 6, 1986) is an American soccer player, who plays as a goalkeeper for Columbus Crew in Major League Soccer.

Career

College and amateur
Bush attended Lake Catholic High School in Mentor, Ohio and played college soccer at Akron, where he was named to the NSCAA all-Great Lakes Region and the 2008 all-Ohio team season. He was also a three-time all-Mid American Conference first team selection, the 2005 MAC Newcomer of the Year, was named to the 2005 Freshman All-American team, and remains the all-time career leader in the MAC in wins (62), shutouts (48), and G.A.A (.60).

During his college years Bush also played with Chicago Fire Premier, the Cleveland Internationals, and the Cape Cod Crusaders in the USL Premier Development League, being named to the PDL All-Central Conference team in 2006.

Professional

Lower divisions
Bush turned professional in 2009, and after failing to secure a professional contract with Seattle Sounders FC of Major League Soccer, signed to play with the Cleveland City Stars of the USL First Division. He made his professional debut on May 30, 2009, in a game against the Charleston Battery.

On February 18, 2010, Crystal Palace Baltimore announced the signing of Bush to a contract for the 2010 season. After spending the 2010 season with Crystal Palace Baltimore, Bush signed with Montreal Impact of the North American Soccer League on March 11, 2011. On September 27, 2011, Bush received the 2011 Golden Glove award, an award given to the goalkeeper with the best goals-against average in the NASL.

Major League Soccer
Bush signed a contract with the Montreal Impact to remain with the club for their inaugural season in Major League Soccer on October 21, 2011.
On November 21, 2014, Bush was signed to a new contract by the Impact.

Bush won the Golden Glove Award as the best goalkeeper of the 2014–15 CONCACAF Champions League. On April 22, 2015, in the first leg of the Champions League final at Club América, Bush was given a controversial yellow card after allowing a goal for kicking the ball at Paul Aguilar, an America player. However, replays show that Aguilar jumped in front of the ball as Bush was kicking it away.  Aguilar then punched Bush in the face, which went unnoticed by the referee.  This yellow card suspended him for the second leg in Montreal.  Bush showed his frustration for the call after the match, saying "After every goal I give up, I kick the ball towards midfield. Every single goal. The fact is that I had the ball in my hands, I kicked it towards midfield and he comes and blocks the ball. Then he hits me in the face." As a result, Bush missed the second leg of the final, which Montreal lost 4–2 and 5–3 on aggregate.

On September 28, 2020, Montreal traded Bush to Canadian rival Vancouver Whitecaps FC, in exchange for Vancouver's third-round pick in the 2021 MLS SuperDraft.

Bush was traded to Columbus Crew on December 14, 2020, in exchange for $125,000 of General Allocation Money. During the 2021 season, Bush made five total appearances for the Crew, including the 2–0 shutout of Cruz Azul in the Campeones Cup. On January 10, 2022, Bush re-signed with the Columbus Crew for the 2022 season, with an option for the 2023 season.

Honors

Club
Montreal Impact
Canadian Championship: 2013, 2014, 2019

Columbus Crew
 Campeones Cup: 2021

Individual
CONCACAF Champions League Golden Glove: 2014–15

Career statistics

References

External links
 
 Montreal Impact bio
 Cleveland City Stars bio

Living people
1986 births
Akron Zips men's soccer players
Cape Cod Crusaders players
Chicago Fire U-23 players
Cleveland City Stars players
Cleveland Internationals players
Crystal Palace Baltimore players
Expatriate soccer players in Canada
Montreal Impact (1992–2011) players
CF Montréal players
Vancouver Whitecaps FC players
Columbus Crew players
American soccer players
American expatriate soccer players
Association football goalkeepers
USL League Two players
USL First Division players
USSF Division 2 Professional League players
North American Soccer League players
Major League Soccer players
Soccer players from Ohio
People from Lake County, Ohio